Liga was a Philippine pay television channel owned by Creative Programs, Inc. and ABS-CBN Sports (content provider). It was the sister channel of ABS-CBN Sports and Action (S+A) and was launched on January 15, 2018 as the permanent replacement of three CPI-owned channels, ABS-CBN Regional Channel, Tag TV, and Hero TV (through its channel space).

Liga was the official broadcast partner of the 2018 FIFA World Cup and the 2018 FIFA World Cup European Qualifiers in Russia, along with S+A. Aside from FIFA World Cup, the channel also broadcast local and international sports coverage including the Maharlika Pilipinas Basketball League (MPBL), ASEAN Basketball League (ABL), the Philippine NCAA, University Athletic Association of the Philippines (UAAP), Premier Volleyball League (PVL), Philippine Azkals matches, Pinoy Pride boxing promotions, ONE Championship fights, and classic basketball and volleyball games from the UAAP.

The channel became the interim replacement of ABS-CBN Sports and Action (S+A) which ceased free-to-air broadcast operations as ordered by the National Telecommunications Commission (NTC) on May 5, 2020, due to the lapsing of ABS-CBN's legislative broadcast franchise.

After almost 2 years of broadcast, Liga ceased operations on pay TV effective October 30, 2020 due to the ensuing programming redundancy, lack of advertising support, and cost-cutting measures, as well as the implementation of a retrenchment program covering its business company from August 7, following the House of Representatives' 70-11 vote denying the company a fresh congressional franchise on July 10 and the dissolution of ABS-CBN Sports effective August 31. The last program to air on this channel was a replay of UAAP Season 78 men's basketball tournaments finals. After airing a tribute video showing the past sports coverage, local programs and events produced or sponsored by ABS-CBN Sports. Liga channel signed off for the last time on October 29, 2020, ending with Lupang Hinirang, an ABS-CBN's official Philippine National Anthem 2011 video before signing off at 12 midnight on October 30, 2020. The channel's cable space was later taken over by Cine Mo!, a complementary movie channel consisting of local films and foreign movies, seen on SkyCable and selected provincial cable providers.

Programming

Final programming
PVL now with One Sports
UAAP now with One Sports
NCAA now with GMA Network
ABL now with Solar Sports
MPBL now with A2Z later with One PH
ONE Championship now with One Sports

Original programming
The Score
Team FitFil Kalye ConfessionsUpfrontExtra RiceTBHMPBL Beyond''

See also
 ABS-CBN Sports (dissolved)
 ABS-CBN (inactive)
 S+A (defunct)
 Balls (defunct)
 NBA TV Philippines
 UAAP Varsity Channel
 One Sports
 PBA Rush
 Solar Sports

References

External links
 

 
Creative Programs
Sports television networks in the Philippines
Assets owned by ABS-CBN Corporation
English-language television stations in the Philippines
Television channels and stations established in 2018
2018 establishments in the Philippines
Television channels and stations disestablished in 2020
2020 disestablishments in the Philippines
ABS-CBN Corporation channels
Defunct television networks in the Philippines